is a Japanese former Nippon Professional Baseball pitcher.

References 

1982 births
Living people
Baseball people from Gunma Prefecture 
Meiji University alumni
Honolulu Sharks players
Japanese expatriate baseball players in the United States
Nippon Professional Baseball pitchers
Tohoku Rakuten Golden Eagles players
Tokyo Yakult Swallows players